The 1996 World Snooker Championship (also referred to as the 1996 Embassy World Snooker Championship for the purposes of sponsorship) was a professional ranking snooker tournament that took place between 20 April and 6 May 1996 at the Crucible Theatre in Sheffield, England.

Stephen Hendry won his sixth World Championship by defeating Peter Ebdon 18–12, equalling the modern-day record of Steve Davis and Ray Reardon. The tournament was sponsored by cigarette manufacturer Embassy.

Tournament summary
 In the first round, Alain Robidoux accused Ronnie O'Sullivan of showing him disrespect by playing left-handed for most of one  of their , and refused to shake hands with O'Sullivan when the match ended. O'Sullivan's reaction to this was to claim that "I'm better with my left hand than he was with his right."
 O'Sullivan received a two-year suspended ban and a £20,000 fine, plus another £10,000 to be donated to charity, for an alleged assault on an official.
 Terry Griffiths won his first round match for the 14th time in a row (the first being in 1983), a record that was beaten in 2018 by Ronnie O'Sullivan. In the second round, Griffiths lost 8–13 against Steve Davis, his seventh loss in seven matches against Davis at the Crucible.
O'Sullivan's 13–4 victory over Tony Drago in the second round set the record for the fastest best-of-25-frames match in a professional tournament at just 167 minutes and 33 seconds.
The final is the only time in Crucible history that the world champion did not take the last shot of the championship. Needing snookers, Peter Ebdon missed a shot and left Stephen Hendry a simple pot, but decided to concede the match rather than let Hendry continue.
 This was Hendry's fifth consecutive title, a record for the modern era.

Legendary BBC commentator Ted Lowe retired after the conclusion of the final.

Prize fund
The breakdown of prize money for this year is shown below:
Winner: £200,000
Runner-up: £120,000
Semi-final: £60,000
Quarter-final: £30,500
Last 16: £16,000
Last 32: £9,000
Highest break: £17,000
Maximum break: £147,000
Total: £1,200,000

Main draw 
Shown below are the results for each round. The numbers in parentheses beside some of the players are their seeding ranks (each championship has 16 seeds and 16 qualifiers).

Century breaks 
There were 48 century breaks in the 1996 World Snooker Championship, a new record which would last until 1998. The highest break of the tournament was 144 made by both Peter Ebdon and Tony Drago. This was only the second time since 1980, when Kirk Stevens and Steve Davis both made a 136, that two players had the joint highest break of the championship. Stephen Hendry made 11 century breaks in the tournament, one short of his record of 12 set the previous year.

 144, 138, 137, 123, 109, 107, 100, 100  Peter Ebdon
 144, 115  Tony Drago
 139, 126, 120, 106, 103, 102, 102, 101, 100  Ronnie O'Sullivan
 137, 130, 104, 101  John Higgins
 135, 125, 121, 118, 113, 110, 108, 106, 105, 104, 104  Stephen Hendry
 129  Jason Ferguson
 125  Alan McManus

 123, 120, 101  Dave Harold
 116, 105, 104, 103  Steve Davis
 115  Anthony Hamilton
 110  Darren Morgan
 109  Ken Doherty
 103  Euan Henderson
 100  Jimmy White

References

World Snooker Championships
World Championship
World Snooker Championship
Sports competitions in Sheffield
World Snooker Championship
World Snooker Championship